The Party of People's Unity was a liberal-conservative and secularist political party in Tajikistan. The party was founded by Abdumalik Abdullajanov in 1994 and banned in 1998. It was a part of the United Tajik Opposition faction during the Tajikistani Civil War.

References

Political parties in Tajikistan
Banned political parties